The Reverend David Granfield (April 11, 1922 – July 31, 2010) was a Roman Catholic priest in the Order of Saint Benedict, associated with Saint Anselm's Abbey in Washington, D.C., and a professor emeritus at The Catholic University of America's Columbus School of Law in Washington, D.C.  He is most well known as a canon lawyer for his exposition of the Catholic Church’s view on abortion.  His text on the inner experience of law continues to be a resource at many law schools.

He received the following degrees: A.B., 1944, College of the Holy Cross, LL.B., 1947, Harvard University, M.A., 1953, S.T.D., 1962, The Catholic University of America.
He was a professor at the Columbus School of Law from 1960 to 1995.

Bibliography

Books
Domestic Relations. New York: Foundation Press, 1963. (with Philip A. Ryan)
The Abortion Decision. New York: Doubleday, 1969.
The Inner Experience of Law: A Jurisprudence of Subjectivity. Washington, D.C.: Catholic University of America Press, 1988.
Heightened Consciousness: The Mystical Difference. New York: Paulist Press, 1991.

Articles
"Jurors, Jury Charges and Insanity." Catholic University Law Review 14 (January 1965): 1 (with Richard Arens and Jackwell Susman)

References

David Granfield. Heightened Consciousness: The Mystical Difference. New York: Paulist Press, 1991. 
Monastic Interreligious Dialog review
 David Granfield. The Inner Experience of Law: A Jurisprudence of Subjectivity. Washington, D.C.: Catholic University of America Press, 1988.   
CUA Press link
 Patrick Granfield: A Biographical Essay, by David Granfield, in The Gift of the Church: a textbook on ecclesiology. Peter C. Phan, editor.  Collegeville: Liturgical Press, 2000.  
Google cache of BOOK REVIEW: A Brief, Liberal, Catholic Defense of Abortion

1922 births
2010 deaths
American Roman Catholic priests
American Benedictines
Canon law jurists
College of the Holy Cross alumni
Harvard Law School alumni
Catholic University of America alumni
Columbus School of Law faculty